Helene Kappler-Palmiotto (born 15 March 1973) is a Venezuelan former professional tennis player.

Kappler appeared in five Federation Cup ties for Venezuela, all in 1992. She partnered with Eleonora Vegliante for three wins and two losses in doubles rubbers. Her only singles rubber was a loss to Mexico's Angélica Gavaldón.

In 1993 she won a bronze medal at the Central American and Caribbean Games in Ponce, along with María Virginia Francesa and Ninfa Marra in the team event.

ITF finals

Doubles: 2 (0–2)

References

External links
 
 
 

1973 births
Living people
Venezuelan female tennis players
Competitors at the 1993 Central American and Caribbean Games
Central American and Caribbean Games bronze medalists for Venezuela
Central American and Caribbean Games medalists in tennis
20th-century Venezuelan women
21st-century Venezuelan women